The Hunterdon County Polytech Career Academy is a vocational public high school that offers technical and career training to students in Hunterdon County, New Jersey, United States, operating as part of the Hunterdon County Vocational School District. The school is situated at two separate facilities in Raritan Township, the Bartles Corner Campus located off of Bartles Corner Road and the Central Campus located next to the Hunterdon Central Regional High School Field House.

References

External links

Public high schools in Hunterdon County, New Jersey
Vocational schools in New Jersey